The Pangerang, also spelt Bangerang and Bangarang, are the Indigenous Australians who traditionally occupied much of what is now north-eastern Victoria stretching along the Murray River to Echuca and into the areas of the southern Riverina in New South Wales. They may not have been an independent tribal reality, as Norman Tindale thought, but one of the many Yorta Yorta tribes. For the purposes of this article, they are treated separately, according to those sources that maintain the distinction.

Country
It covered areas east and west of Shepparton, taking in also Wangaratta, Benalla, and Kyabram. The southern reaches extend as far as Toolamba and Violet Town.

Social structure
The Bangerang collective of tribes, or nation, also known as the Yorta Yorta, consists of 8 hordes, according to Norman Tindale, though others have been included in the list.
 Moiraduban
 Waningotbun. (at Kotupna)
 Maragan. (perhaps Maraban.)
 Owanguttha.

We know somewhat more about the fish-loving Wongatpan and the opossum-hunting Towroonban, two Pangerang clans, simply because they happen to have been the tribes inhabiting the area where the ethnographer Edward Micklethwaite Curr took over his pastoral run.

Alternative names
 Panggarang, Pangorang, Pangurang, Pine-gorine, Pine-go-rine, Pinegerine, Pinegorong
 Bangerang, Banjgaranj
 Pallaganmiddah
 Jabalajabala. (from the word jabala meaning no), a name applied to western Pangerang hordes)
 Yaballa, Yabula-yabula
 Waningotbun
 Maragan
 Owanguttha
 Yurt. (exonym used by northerners and the Ngurelban, from jurta, meaning no)
 Yoorta
 Moiraduban
 Moitheriban
 Bangarang

History
Some Pangerang were killed in colonial frontier wars, such as at the massacre at Moira Swamp/Lake Barmah.

Notes

Citations

Sources

 Note: mentioned as derived from Fraser; cannot find that spelling in Fraser (1892), but Sutton (2004), p.95 mentions that spelling as from R.H. Mathews. Needs further investigation.

Aboriginal peoples of New South Wales
Aboriginal peoples of Victoria (Australia)
Goulburn River
History of Victoria (Australia)